The 2013/14 NTFL season was the 93rd season of the Northern Territory Football League (NTFL).

St Marys completed a perfect season to claim there 30th premiership title defeating the Wanderers by 21 points.

 The match between Southern Districts and Tiwi Bombers in Round 8 was abandoned.

Ladder

Grand Final

References

Northern Territory Football League seasons
NTFL